A Beta-2 adrenergic antagonist (β2-adrenoceptor antagonist) is an adrenergic antagonist which blocks the beta-2 adrenergic receptors of cells, with either high specificity (an antagonist which is selective for β2 adrenoceptors) like Butaxamine and ICI-118,551, or non-specifically (an antagonist for β2 and for β1 or β3 adrenoceptors) like the non-selective betablocker Propranolol.

See also
 ICI-118,551
 Butaxamine
 Propranolol
 Betablocker
 Beta-2 adrenergic receptor
 Beta2-adrenergic agonist

References 

Beta blockers